The Escondido Freeway is one of the named principal Southern California freeways. It consists of the following segments:
California State Route 15, from Interstate 5 southeast of Downtown San Diego and Interstate 8 in San Diego
Interstate 15, from Interstate 8 in San Diego to Interstate 215 in Murrieta
Note: The portion from the San Diego-Riverside County line to Interstate 215 is also designated as part of Temecula Valley Freeway
Interstate 215, from Interstate 15 in Murrieta to California State Route 60 east of Riverside

Southern California freeways
Named freeways in California
Interstate 15
Roads in San Diego County, California
Roads in Riverside County, California